Dr Amar Agarwal M.S., FRCS, F.R.C.Ophth is an Indian ophthalmologist and chairman and managing director of Dr. Agarwal's Eye Hospital and Eye Research Centre in India, which includes 95+ eye hospitals. He is the recipient of the Best Doctor award of the State government from then Chief Minister of Tamil Nadu J Jayalalithaa on 15 August 2014. He is also the past President of the International Society of Refractive Surgery (ISRS) and Secretary General of the Intraocular Implant and Refractive Society of India (IIRSI).

Early life and education
Amar Agarwal was born in Chennai on 20 July 1960 to Padma Bhushan Dr. Jaiveer Agarwal and Dr. Tahira Agarwal.
He completed M.B.B.S. degree in February 1983 from Madras Medical College, Madras University. His further qualifications include M.S.(Ophtha) in July 1986 from Ahmedabad Civil Hospital, University of Gujarat, FRCS in October 1986 from the Royal College of Surgeons of Edinburgh, United Kingdom and F.R.C.Ophth in October 1988 from Royal College of Ophthalmologists, London, United Kingdom.

Career

Prof. Amar Agarwal is the pioneer of  Phakonit which is Phako with a Needle Incision Technology. This technique became popularized as Bimanual phaco, Microincision Cataract surgery (MICS) or Microphaco. He is the first to remove cataracts through a 0.7 mm tip with the technique called Microphakonit. He has also discovered No anesthesia cataract surgery and FAVIT a new technique to remove dropped nuclei. The air pump which was a simple idea of using an aquarium fish pump to increase the fluid into the eye in bimanual phaco and co-axial phaco has helped prevent surge. This built the basis of various techniques of forced infusion for small incision cataract surgery.  He was also the first to use trypan blue for staining epiretinal membranes and publishing the details in his 4 volume textbook of ophthalmology. He has also discovered a new refractive error called Aberropia. He has also been the first to do a combined surgery of microphakonit (700 micron cataract surgery) with a 25 gauge vitrectomy in the same patient thus having the smallest incisions possible for cataract and vitrectomy. He is also the first surgeon to implant a new mirror telescopic IOL (LMI) for patients with age related macular degeneration. He has also been the first in the world to implant a Glued IOL. In this a PC IOL is fixed in an eye without any capsules using fibrin glue. The Malyugin ring for small pupil cataract surgery was also modified by him as the Agarwal modification of the Malyugin ring for miotic pupil cataract surgeries with posterior capsular defects. Dr.Agarwal's eye hospital has also done for the first time an Anterior segment transplantation in a 4 month old child with anterior staphyloma. Prof. Agarwal has also reported and operated the first Pre-Descemet's Endothelial Keratoplasty (PDEK), a new type of corneal transplantation that can be used for patients with swelling or edema of the cornea.

Personal life

Amar Agarwal is married to Dr Athiya Agarwal, an ophthalmologist. They have two sons, named Dr Adil Agarwal and Dr Anosh Agarwal. He has adopted his sister Dr. Sunita Agarwal's sons Dr Ashvin Agarwal and Dr Ashar Agarwal. All 4 of them being ophthalmologists and manage Dr. Agarwal's Eye Hospital.

Bibliography

Books

Awards, Video Awards and Honours

Prof. Agarwal has received many awards for his work done in ophthalmology most significant being the Barraquer Award and the Kelman Award. His videos have won many awards at the film festivals of ASCRS, AAO and ESCRS. He has also written more than 50 books which have been published in various languages- English, Spanish and Polish. He also trains doctors from all over the world in his center on phaco, bimanual phaco, lasik and retina. He heads Dr.Agarwals group of eye hospitals which has 67 eye hospitals. He has also been the Professor of Ophthalmology at Sri Ramachandra Medical College and Research Institute in Chennai, India.

References

Indian ophthalmologists
Living people
Medical doctors from Chennai
1960 births